Milwich is a village and a civil parish in the English county of Staffordshire.

Location 
The village is situated on the B 5027. The nearest main road are the A51 which passes the village  to the south west.

Population 
The 2011 census recorded a population of 418 in 175 Households. The parish comes under the Stafford Non-Metropolitan District.

Village Facilities 
The village has a post office which can be found at Prospect House, Coton Hill. Within the village there is one public house which is called the Green Man. The parish church is called All Saints which is notable for possessing the oldest dated bell in Staffordshire and the seventh oldest dated English bell. The present church was rebuilt in place of an early medieval church 1792 and is a Grade II listed building. Further renovations and alterations saw a gallery added in 1837 with the interior pitch pine paneled installed in 1888.

History

Domesday Book 
Milwich is listed in the Domesday Book of 1086. In the survey the village has the name  Mulewiche and Melewich in the Hundred of Pirehill. In the survey the settlement was described as quite small with only 8 households. The assets of the village listed include 4 villager or villein, meadow of 1 acres, a league of woodland and 4 smallholders. There was also 4 ploughlands (land for), 1 lord's plough teams, 3 men's plough teams. In 1066 the lord of the manor was held by Swein Rafwin. In 1086 the lord of the manor was held by Osbern. The Tenant-in-chief in 1086 was Robert of Stafford. Taxation figures show the village had a Taxable value 0.8 geld units with a value to lord in 1086 of £1. The total tax assessment was valued at 1 geld unit.

Landowners 
Staffordshire records show that by the thirteenth century the manor was controlled by two main landowners. The landowners were called Geoffrey, son of Philip de Nugent and Robert de Milwich. Robert de Milwich’s home was Milwich Hall. The Hall, which is a Grade II listed building, is a timber-framed house. This house was built on the site of what was thought to be the original Saxon Hall,
which was encircled by a moat. The basis of the house was possibly built by the Astons of Tixall, who acquired a pocket of land in Milwich in 1493.

By the twentieth century, the main landowner in Milwich was the Earl of Harrowby from Sandon Hall

See also
Listed buildings in Milwich

References 

Villages in Staffordshire